Dominic Tirrey, a Chaplain to Henry VIII was Bishop of Cork and Cloyne from 1536 to1557 despite the appointment being opposed by Pope Paul III.

References

Bishops of Cork and Cloyne
16th-century Anglican bishops in Ireland